Lindsay John Brown  ( – 6 August 2020) was a New Zealand accountant. He served as chancellor of the University of Otago from 2004 to 2008.

Biography
Brown graduated with a Bachelor of Commerce in accountancy from the University of Otago. He went on to become a partner in the international accounting firm Deloitte, and was managing partner of the Dunedin office for 10 years. He was a member of the Council of the University of Otago for 16 years, and was chancellor for five years, from 2004 to 2008, having previously served as pro-chancellor. He subsequently chaired the advisory board of the School of Business at the University of Otago. He was also a member of the national board of the Cancer Society of New Zealand, and served as chair of the Otago Southland division of the organisation.

On 10 December 2008, Brown was conferred with an honorary LLD degree by the University of Otago. In the 2011 New Year Honours, he was appointed a Member of the New Zealand Order of Merit, for services to the community.

Brown died in Dunedin on 6 August 2020, aged 76.

References

1940s births
2020 deaths
New Zealand accountants
Chancellors of the University of Otago
Members of the New Zealand Order of Merit
Date of birth missing
People from Dunedin